Rodengo-Saiano is a comune in the province of Brescia, in Lombardy. A center of the Franciacorta historical region, it was founded in 1927 from the communes of Rodengo and Saiano.

It is home to a Cluniac monastery, the Abbazia di San Nicola (Abbey of St. Nicholas), founded in the mid-11th century.

Twin towns
 Kürten, Germany

References

Cities and towns in Lombardy